Copelatus brevistrigatus is a species of diving beetle. It is part of the genus Copelatus in the subfamily Copelatinae of the family Dytiscidae. It was described by Guignot in 1959.

References

brevistrigatus
Beetles described in 1959